Niels Waldemar Hansen (23 October 1892 – 10 October 1972) was a Danish sailor. He competed in the 8 Metre event at the 1936 Summer Olympics.

References

External links
 
 

1892 births
1972 deaths
Danish male sailors (sport)
Olympic sailors of Denmark
Sailors at the 1936 Summer Olympics – 8 Metre
People from Køge Municipality
Sportspeople from Region Zealand